Nigel Ng Kin-ju (born 15 March 1991), better known by his online persona Uncle Roger, is a Malaysian stand-up comedian and internet celebrity based in London, England. Ng prides himself on various East, Southeast, and South Asian stereotypes, and became popular on social media as his online persona, a middle-aged Asian man reviewing Asian food recipes who speaks Cantonese as a first language with an exaggerated and pronounced accent.

Early life
Ng was born in Kuala Lumpur to Malaysian Chinese parents of Hokkien ancestry. Ng's father is a car salesman and his mother is a full-time homemaker.

After graduating from Chong Hwa Independent High School, Kuala Lumpur in 2009, Ng moved to the United States to study at Northwestern University, majoring in engineering and minoring in philosophy, graduating in 2014.

Career
Ng is a fan of Hong Kong comic actor Stephen Chow, and cites Chow's films as having inspired him to become a comedian.

Ng won the Amused Moose Laugh-Off 2016 and was runner-up in the Laughing Horse New Act of the Year 2015. He was also a finalist in the Leicester Mercury Comedian of the Year (2016) and Leicester Square New Comedian of the Year (2015). Ng was nominated for the "Best Newcomer Award" for his stand-up comedy show at the Edinburgh Fringe Festival in 2019.

Ng made his TV debut in 2018 on Comedy Central's Stand Up Central.

He hosted the comedy podcasts Rice to Meet You with UK-based Swedish comedian Evelyn Mok. and HAIYAA with Nigel Ng with his producer Matt 

On 2 January 2021, Ng uploaded his first Chinese video in Bilibili, a video sharing website in China. On 12 January, Ng apologised on the China social media platform Sina Weibo and deleted a video featuring fellow YouTube star Mike Chen who had been critical of the Chinese Communist Party, and who had been associated with Falun Gong. Ng stated, "This video has made a bad social impact...I wasn't aware of his political thoughts and his past incorrect remarks about China...I hope you can give Uncle Roger, who has just entered China, a chance to improve!" Ng's move attracted criticism on Twitter. In his first subsequent video as Uncle Roger, he said he would "keep making funny videos – no politics, no drama".

In 2021, he appeared on the first episode of Mock the Week Series 19, a British comedy show on BBC Two.

Uncle Roger 
Ng has become best known for his comedic persona Uncle Roger, who speaks with a pronounced Cantonese-like accent and prides himself on various East and Southeast Asian stereotypes. His comedy partner Evelyn Mok came up with the middle-aged Asian uncle character for a sitcom with Ng in mind, and Ng further developed the character on TikTok and Instagram sketches before moving the character onto YouTube.

In July 2020, Ng attracted attention for his YouTube video critique of Hersha Patel's BBC Food video on cooking egg-fried rice in the Uncle Roger persona. After the video went viral, Ng and Patel appeared on BBC together. Ng has also collaborated with Patel on a YouTube video. In August 2020, Ng worked in Liz Haigh's restaurant, Mei Mei. In September 2020, he posted a critique video with regards to Gordon Ramsay's fried rice cooking, in which he praised Ramsay for his correct technique. Ng has released numerous videos critiquing Jamie Oliver's versions of popular Asian dishes like egg-fried rice and Thai green curry. He has made it clear that he does not want any of his viewers to spread hate towards anyone. He has also reviewed the fried rice of a number of other chefs.

In 28 February 2021, he became a special guest on MasterChef Singapore Season 2.

On August 14, 2022, he became a guest judge on Junior MasterChef Indonesia Season 3 during the Final 3.

On October 13, 2022, he also became a guest diner on Hell's Kitchen Season 21. He complained on the Blue Team being slow on service and wished to be on the Red Team's service with Tony Hawk.

Reception
The accent Ng uses for the Uncle Roger character has also received criticism for perpetuating negative stereotypes about Asians, and his act has been compared to a minstrel show. Chef J. Kenji López-Alt, who is of Japanese descent, criticised him in the description of his egg fried rice tutorial, saying "I don't like that his schtick seems to give a free pass to people to imitate stereotypical Asian speech patterns and pronunciation (especially as it's almost always non-Asians doing the imitating). It's ugly, it’s yellowface, it’s not funny, and it promotes anti-Asian racism at a time when Asians are already being heavily discriminated against."

Personal life
Ng currently resides in London, United Kingdom.

In 2020, Ng revealed that he was a victim of an anti-Asian racist assault in London. He said in one of his live sets, "I got punched, man, in London. This is real." He added that it was a cyclist that had punched him.

References

External links
 
 
 Nigel Ng's channel on YouTube

1991 births
English-language YouTube channels
Living people
People from Kuala Lumpur
Malaysian people of Hokkien descent
Malaysian people of Chinese descent
Malaysian expatriates in the United Kingdom
Malaysian YouTubers
Malaysian stand-up comedians
Northwestern University alumni
21st-century comedians